The Politics of Ecstasy may refer to:
 The Politics of Ecstasy (book), a book by Timothy Leary
 The Politics of Ecstasy (album), a 1996 album by Nevermore, named after the book